Avron is a station on Paris Métro Line 2, on the border of the 11th and 20th arrondissements.

Location
The station is located under Boulevard de Charonne, at the intersection with Rue d'Avron and Rue de Montreuil. Oriented approximately along a north–south axis, it is located between the Alexandre Dumas metro station and the eastern terminus of Nation.

History
 The station was opened on 2 April 1903 when the line was extended from Bagnolet (now called Alexandre Dumas) to Nation. It is named after the Rue d'Avron, which is named after a small nearby plateau that served an important role in the defence of Paris during the Siege of Paris in the Franco-Prussian War.

It was the location of the Barrière de Montreuil, a gate built for the collection of taxation as part of the Wall of the Farmers-General; the gate was built between 1784 and 1788 and demolished in the nineteenth century.

As part of the RATP Renouveau du métro renovation program, the entire station was renovated by 9 December 2005.

On 16 July 2018, part of the nameplates of the station were temporarily replaced to celebrate the victory of the French football team at the 2018 FIFA World Cup, as in five other stations. Avron is humorously renamed Nous Avron gagné as a play on words.

In 2019, 1,871,024 travelers entered this station which places it in 256th position for metro stations for its attendance out of 302.

Passenger services

Access
The station has a single entrance called Boulevard de Charonne, leading to the central median of this boulevard, opposite no. 35. Made up of a fixed staircase, it is adorned with a Guimard entrance, which is subject to a decree as a historical monument on 29 May 1978.

Station layout

Platforms
Avron is a standard configuration station. It has two platforms separated by the metro tracks and the vault is elliptical. The decoration is in the style used for the majority of the metro stations. The bevelled white ceramic tiles cover the walls, the vault, the tunnel exits and the outlets of the corridors, while the lighting is provided by two white lighting tubes. The advertising frames are metallic and the name of the station is written in Parisine font on enamelled plates. The Motte style seats are dark blue.

Bus connections
The station is served by line 57 of the RATP Bus Network.

Gallery

References

Sources 
Roland, Gérard (2003). Stations de métro. D'Abbesses à Wagram. Éditions Bonneton.

Paris Métro stations in the 11th arrondissement of Paris
Paris Métro stations in the 20th arrondissement of Paris
Railway stations in France opened in 1903